Daisy Lake, also referred to as Daisy Lake Reservoir, is a reservoir on the Cheakamus River in the Sea to Sky Corridor of southwestern British Columbia, Canada, just south of the Resort Municipality of Whistler and immediately north of the abandoned townsite of Garibaldi (which until 1932 had been also named Daisy Lake).

Daisy Lake Dam was built in 1957 with the reservoir created merging the former natural Daisy Lake and another named Shadow Lake.  The reservoir supplies the 158MW Cheakamus Generating Station on the Squamish River  via an 11 km tunnel bored beneath the mountain range dividing the two rivers.

There is a BC Hydro-operated recreation area just above the dam, and public campgrounds and picnic tables at Brandywine Falls Provincial Park, which is near the head of the lake.  The upper reaches of the lake are visible from viewing platform on the north side of the falls and also from points along the hiking trails lining the cliff edge above the Cheakamus River north and south of the falls.

The northern, western and southwestern sides of Daisy Lake are influenced by lava flows composing the Cheakamus Valley basalts.

References

Reservoirs in British Columbia
Sea-to-Sky Corridor
New Westminster Land District